This league known as the Nathanielcars.co.uk Welsh League Division One for sponsorship reasons, is a football league in Wales. This is the top division of football in South Wales and the second tier of the Welsh Football League.

The reigning champions are Monmouth Town.  However, they were not promoted to the Welsh Premier League as they did not meet the necessary ground criteria.

Promotion and relegation

Teams promoted from 2013–14 Welsh Football League Division Two 

 Cardiff Metropolitan University - Champions
 Briton Ferry Llansawel - 2nd Place
 Garden Village - 3rd Place

Teams relegated from 2013–14 Welsh Premier League 

 Afan Lido

Stadia and Locations

League table

External links
 About the Welsh football league pyramid welshpremier.co.uk
 Welsh Football League official page

Welsh Football League Division One seasons
Division One
Wales Division One